The Seufert House, also known as the Mautz–Seufert House, is a historic residence in Portland, Oregon, United States. From 1914 to 1929, it was the Portland home of fishing and canning businessman Francis A. Seufert (1853–1929), who was an innovative leader in the upper Columbia River salmon industry at The Dalles. He pioneered use of the fish wheel to harvest fish, as well as the shipment of fresh, iced salmon to eastern markets. The house, built in 1913 in the Colonial Revival style, was the product of the Mautz Building and Investment Company, which built over fifty homes in the exclusive Irvington neighborhood. It was briefly occupied by Edmund J. Mautz prior to its sale to Francis Seufert.

The house was entered on the National Register of Historic Places in 2006.

See also
National Register of Historic Places listings in Northeast Portland, Oregon
Heimrich–Seufert House, the home of Francis A. Seufert's son Edward J. Seufert in The Dalles

References

External links

Oregon Historic Sites Database entry

Colonial Revival architecture in Oregon
Houses completed in 1913
1913 establishments in Oregon
Houses on the National Register of Historic Places in Portland, Oregon
Irvington, Portland, Oregon
Portland Historic Landmarks